Common Children was an alternative rock band composed of Marc Byrd, Drew Powell, and Hampton Taliaferro. The band recorded three studio albums between 1996 and 2001.  The first two, Skywire and Delicate Fade, were released on the now-defunct Tattoo record label, which signed the band after Dan Michaels and Gene Eugene heard them perform at the 1995 Cornerstone Festival. On December 28, 1996, the band recorded their only live album, Setlist, in Jacksonville, Florida. The album had a very limited pressing and consisted of the entire Skywire album (excluding Broken Smile) and two tracks from Delicate Fade. The CD was sold only at concerts and as it contained no over-dubs, showcased the band's talent. Andrew Thompson (who later collaborated with Byrd in Hammock) joined the band on tour after Delicate Fade and produced The Inbetween Time with Marc Byrd. Christine Glass (who married Byrd in 2000 and later formed GlassByrd) also contributed to the songs "Always On The Outside" and "How Many Times", and contributed 'angelic vocals' (per the liner notes) for The Inbetween Time, released on Galaxy 21 Music.

External links
8/26/98 Interview

American Christian rock groups
Musical groups established in 1995